The Price of Life is a 1994 Croatian film directed by Bogdan Žižić.

Cast 
 Slavko Juraga - Ivan
 Barbara Vicković - Anica
 Ivan Tomljenović - Stevan 
 Edo Peročević - Tuco
 Goran Grgić - Dusan
 Ivan Brkić - Vaso

External links

The Price of Life at Filmski-Programi.hr 

1994 films
Croatian war drama films
Films directed by Bogdan Žižić
Yugoslav Wars films
Works about the Croatian War of Independence